Countess Adelaide of Lippe-Biesterfeld (22 June 1870 – 3 September 1948) was the eldest child of Ernest II, Count of Lippe-Biesterfeld and Countess Karoline of Wartensleben.

Family and early life

Adelaide was born on 22 June 1870 to Ernest II, Count of Lippe-Biesterfeld and his wife Countess Karoline of Wartensleben.

After the death of Woldemar, Prince of Lippe in 1895, her parents were involved in a regency and succession dispute to the principality of Lippe. Though Woldemar's younger brother Alexander succeeded, he was incapable of ruling due to a mental illness. Consequently, two branches of the House of Lippe argued over rights to a regency. Prince Adolf of Schaumburg-Lippe, a brother-in-law of Wilhelm II, German Emperor was chosen, but a court-settlement allowed Ernest to become the regent of Lippe-Detmold on 17 July 1897.

Marriage and issue
At Neudorf, Adelaide married Prince Friedrich Johann of Saxe-Meiningen, a younger son of Georg II, Duke of Saxe-Meiningen on 24 April 1889. They had the following children together:

Role in Lippe succession dispute
Two branches of the House of Lippe debated over rights to the principality of Lippe-Detmold.

As Adelaide's great-grandmother was a member of the petite noblesse, her family's claim to full royalty was challenged. This claim threatened the succession to Saxe-Meiningen, as Adelaide was married to the Duke of Saxe-Meiningen's heir apparent; were her father deemed a lesser royal status, it might be thought that her own claim was not equal enough for her husband's family.

Ancestry

References

1870 births
1948 deaths
German countesses
House of Lippe